Ane Cecilie Høgseth (born 15 January 2001) is a Norwegian female handball player who plays for Storhamar HE in the Eliteserien.

She also represented Norway in the 2017 European Women's U-17 Handball Championship and in the 2019 Women's U-19 European Handball Championship, were she receiving bronze and silver.

On 10 March 2021, it was announced that she had signed a 2-year contract with Storhamar HE.

Achievements
European Championship:
Winner: 2022
Junior European Championship:
Bronze Medalist: 2019
Youth European Championship:
Silver Medalist: 2017
Norwegian League:
 Silver: 2021/2022

Awards and recognition
 All-Star Team Best Line Player of the Junior European Championship: 2019

References

2001 births
Living people
Norwegian female handball players
Handball players from Oslo
21st-century Norwegian women